ASG Vorwärts Kamenz was an East German association football club from the city of Kamenz, Saxony.

Following World War II, Germany was occupied by the victorious Allies and a separate state – the German Democratic Republic (German: Deutsche Demokratische Republik, DDR; commonly in English, East Germany) – emerged in the Soviet-held eastern part of the country. The formation of an independent East German football competition soon followed. The name Vorwärts was used in East Germany by those clubs associated with the armed forces, paramilitary organizations, and police.



History
Vorwärts Kamenz was established in 1960 and played lower-tier football early in its existence. In 1974, the first team side of Vorwärts Cottbus was transferred to Kamenz and the club became a fourth division side in the Bezirksliga Dresden. They enjoyed success in local cup play over the next several seasons, capturing the Dresden Cup in 1976, 1978, and 1979.

The improvement of the team propelled them into the second division DDR-Liga in 1979, where they finished in second place in their debut campaign. They remained part of the DDR-Liga until they were sent down to the third division DDR-Bezirksliga following a 10th-place finish in 1984. They were dropped again to the fourth division in 1985 after ending at 15th place. The club folded in 1986.

Vorwärts was a frequent participant in FDGB-Pokal (East German Cup) play (1975, 1977, 1979–84), but never advanced out of the preliminary rounds.

References

Das deutsche Fußball-Archiv historical German domestic league tables 

Football clubs in Germany
Defunct football clubs in Saxony
Football clubs in East Germany
ASG Vorwärts
1960 establishments in East Germany
1986 disestablishments in Germany
Association football clubs established in 1960
Association football clubs disestablished in 1986
Kamenz
Military association football clubs in Germany